Xavier "Xavi" Rabaseda Bertrán (born 24 February 1989) is a Spanish professional basketball player for Surne Bilbao Basket of the Liga ACB and the Basketball Champions League. He is a 1.98 m (6 ft 6 in) tall shooting guard-small forward.

Professional career
After being formed in the youth teams of FC Barcelona, in 2007, Rabaseda joined CB Cornellà, a team affiliated with Barcelona, to play in the LEB Plata league. After two years, and achieving the promotion to the LEB Oro in 2009, he left Cornellà to join FC Barcelona Bàsquet's roster. Despite only playing limited minutes in three games, he was a part of the Barcelona team that won the EuroLeague's  2009-10 season championship, at that season's Euroleague Final Four in Paris.

In 2010, Rabaseda joined Baloncesto Fuenlabrada on loan. Despite being signed for two years with the team of the Community of Madrid, his good performance (9 points and 3 rebounds per game) was enough to earn him a return to FC Barcelona Bàsquet.

In August 2013, he signed with CB Estudiantes. In July 2015, he signed a two-year deal with Gran Canaria.

On July 8, 2020, he has signed with San Pablo Burgos of the Liga ACB. With Burgos, he won the 2019–20 Basketball Champions League and 2020–21 Basketball Champions League.

On July 15, 2022, he signed with Surne Bilbao Basket of the Liga ACB and the Basketball Champions League.

Spain national team
Rabaseda played with the Spain U-20 national team the 2009 FIBA Europe Under-20 Championship, where he won the bronze medal. He was also selected to that tournament's All-Tournament Team. He has also played with the senior men's Spain national team.

References

External links
 Euroleague.net Profile
 Eurobasket.com Profile
 Spanish League Profile 
 Draftexpress.com Profile

1989 births
Living people
2019 FIBA Basketball World Cup players
Baloncesto Fuenlabrada players
Basketball players from Catalonia
Bilbao Basket players
CB Estudiantes players
CB Gran Canaria players
CB Miraflores players
FC Barcelona Bàsquet players
FIBA Basketball World Cup-winning players
Liga ACB players
Shooting guards
Small forwards
Spanish men's basketball players